was an old province of Japan in the area of Kagoshima Prefecture, roughly corresponding to Kumage Subprefecture.

History
Kofun burial mounds on Tanegashima and two very old Shinto shrines on Yakushima suggest that these islands were the southern border of the Yamato state.

Annals of the Nara period regard Tane-no-kuni as the name for all the Ryukyu Islands, including Tanegashima and Yakushima.

 675 {Temmu 3): Ambassadors of "Tane no kuni" were received in the Japanese court.
 702 (Taihō 2}:  The Shoku Nihongi records,  "Satsuma and Tane broke the relation and disobey to the king's order. So (the government) sent an army, conquered them, counted the population, and placed the officials." This marks the establishment of the Satsuma and Tane Provinces.
 824 (Tenchō 1): Tane was annexed to Ōsumi Province.

Notes

References
 Beillevaire, Patrick. (2000). Ryūkyū Studies to 1854: Western Encounter, Vol. 1.  London: Taylor & Francis. ; ;  OCLC 468547073
 Nussbaum, Louis-Frédéric and Käthe Roth. (2005).  Japan encyclopedia. Cambridge: Harvard University Press. ;  OCLC 58053128

Other websites 

  Murdoch's map of provinces, 1903

Former provinces of Japan